Karl Vossler (6 September 1872, in Hohenheim – 19 September 1949, in Munich) was a German linguist and scholar, and a leading Romanist. Vossler was known for his interest in Italian thought, and as a follower of Benedetto Croce. He declared his support of the German military by signing the Manifesto of the Ninety-Three in 1914. However, he opposed the Nazi government, and supported many Jewish intellectuals at that time.

In 1897 he received his doctorate from the University of Heidelberg, and in 1909 was named a professor of Romance studies at the University of Würzburg. From 1911 onward, he taught classes at the University of Munich.

Works by Vossler published in English 
 "Mediaeval culture; an introduction to Dante and his times"; translated by William Cranston Lawton (1929).
 "The spirit of language in civilization"; translated by Oscar Oeser (1932).
 "Jean Racine"; translated by Isabel and Florence McHugh (1972).

See also
 Karl-Vossler-Preis

Notes

External links
 
 Dante Alighieri: Die Göttliche Komödie. Deutsch von Karl Vossler Text Italienisch-Deutsch Koloriert Italienisch-Deutsch koloriert

1872 births
1949 deaths
German Hispanists
Romance philologists
Linguists from Germany
Heidelberg University alumni
Writers from Stuttgart
Academic staff of the University of Würzburg
Academic staff of the Ludwig Maximilian University of Munich
Recipients of the Pour le Mérite (civil class)
Members of the German Academy of Sciences at Berlin